Ellen "Nelly" Dean is a female character in Emily Brontë's 1847 novel Wuthering Heights. She is the main narrator in the book, and she provides eyewitness accounts of many of the story's central events to Mr Lockwood.

Ellen Dean is called "Nelly" by most of the book's characters, though Lockwood refers to her as "Mrs Dean".

Story 
A tenant named Lockwood visits the household of Wuthering Heights and is overcome with shock when he believes he has seen the ghost of Catherine Earnshaw at a window in one of the chambers of the Heights. Eager to know the story of Heathcliff, the master of Wuthering Heights, Lockwood returns to Thrushcross Grange, his temporary residence, and asks Nelly, the housekeeper, to tell him all she knows.

Nelly's mother was a servant at Wuthering Heights and helped to raise Hindley Earnshaw. Nelly was a servant to Hindley and his sister Catherine Earnshaw. Nelly is the same age as Hindley and about six years older than Cathy. After an orphan boy named Heathcliff is brought to live at Wuthering Heights Nelly witnesses the Earnshaw family's misfortunes, the affection that Mr Earnshaw has for Heathcliff (which leads to Hindley's bitter jealousy), and the childhood companionship between Heathcliff and Catherine, which eventually blossoms into a passionate love.

When Edgar Linton of Thrushcross Grange asks Catherine for her hand in marriage Catherine confides in Nelly, explaining that she is in love with Heathcliff. Nelly is the only witness to Catherine's famous "I am Heathcliff" speech. Nelly's own reaction to it is derisive and incredulous.

After Hindley’s wife Frances dies of consumption (tuberculosis) Hindley rapidly loses his health and sanity, and Nelly nurses his infant son Hareton Earnshaw.

Catherine marries Edgar Linton and Heathcliff mysteriously disappears for three years. Nelly goes with the Lintons to Thrushcross Grange,where she witnesses Heathcliff's return and his quest for revenge on both Hindley and the Lintons. She is also present for Catherine's illness, delusions and final meeting with Heathcliff.

Catherine's death after childbirth causes Nelly to nurse Catherine's child, Catherine Linton (known as Cathy), whom she and Edgar try to keep safe from Heathcliff's machinations. Heathcliff succeeds is forcing  Cathy into marriage with his weak and sickly son Linton. Nelly hears from Zillah, the housekeeper at Wuthering Heights, about Cathy's misery there.

Heathcliff eventually asks Nelly to come back to Wuthering Heights. She finds him dead soon afterward, and makes plans to move back to Thrushcross Grange with Cathy and Hareton.

Character 
Nelly is an example of the "unreliable narrator", as is Lockwood. She is too close to the events and he is not  involved in them. For example, she insists that she did not love Catherine Earnshaw, yet she cried bitterly after her death. Nelly repeatedly complains about the Earnshaws and the Lintons, but she never ceases to seek peace at both Wuthering Heights and Thrushcross Grange.

In "The Villain in Wuthering Heights" (1958) James Hafley argues that Nelly seems to be the moral centre of the novel only because of the instability and violence of the world she describes. In his view, she is the true villain of the novel, as she drives the majority of the conflicts, and Lockwood's faith in her story is a sign of his innocence.

References 

Fictional servants
Characters in Wuthering Heights